The AirAsia Flying Spikers were a professional women's volleyball team that played in the 2014 All-Filipino Conference of the Philippine Super Liga (PSL). The team was owned by AirAsia Philippines and disbanded after the tournament. For the following conference, the coaching staff and players went on to form the first iteration of the Generika Lifesavers.

Roster
For the 2014 PSL All-Filipino Conference:

Coaching staff
 Head coach: Ramil de Jesus
 Assistant coach(s): Noel Orcullo Benson Bocboc

Team staff
 Team manager: Edwin Jeremillo
 Team Utility: 

Medical Staff
 Team Physician: 
 Physical Therapist: Lace Salimbao

Honors

Team

Individual

See also
Shopinas.com Lady Clickers

External links
 PSL-AirAsia Flying Spikers Page

References

Philippine Super Liga
2014 establishments in the Philippines
Volleyball clubs established in 2014
Women's volleyball teams in the Philippines